Paranisopodus genieri is a species of beetle in the family Cerambycidae. It was described by Monne and Monne in 2007.

References

Acanthocinini
Beetles described in 2007